Raja Lakshmeshwar Singh was a former member of the Uttar Pradesh Legislative Assembly from Basti District, Uttar Pradesh.

References

Basti ka Rajgharana 
RLD Leader Raja Aishwarya Raj Singh 
Raja Aishwarya Raj Singh

External links
 Raja Lakshmeshwar Singh NGO, Official homepage
 STATISTICAL REPORTS OF ASSEMBLY ELECTIONS.Select --> Uttar Pradesh --> 1991
 or open this PDF and search for Basti

People from Uttar Pradesh
People from Basti district
Members of the Uttar Pradesh Legislative Assembly
1954 births
2005 deaths